Brummel may refer to:

Beau Brummel (1778–1840), important figure in Regency England and for many years the arbiter of men's fashion
Daniel Brummel (born 1981), American singer-songwriter, composer, producer, and multi-instrumentalist
Lisa Brummel (born 1959), American businesswoman, Executive Vice President of Human Resources for Microsoft
Marije Brummel (born 1985), Dutch football coach and former defensive midfielder
Tony Brummel, founder of Victory Records, a Chicago-based record label

See also
Brummel & Brown, a butter spread introduced by Van den Bergh Foods (now Unilever) in 1994
Brummel hook, a clip for joining a flag or ensign to flag halyards so that the flag can be hoisted
Brummell (disambiguation)
Brumel
Bromell
Brommella
Broomella